Best Music Video is an Aotearoa Music Award that honours New Zealand artists for excellence in music video production. The award was first presented in 1983 and is given to the video director. Previous winners have included feature film directors Niki Caro, Jonathan King and Chris Graham, and acclaimed artist Fane Flaws. The most wins have gone to Joe Lonie (aka Jo Fisher) who won three time for Supergroove videos and a fourth for Goodshirt. In 2012 all three nominees went to Special Problems, the creative partnership of Joel Kefali and Campbell Hooper.

Recipients

References 

Best Music Video
Music video awards
Awards established in 1983